Pleasington railway station serves the village of Pleasington in Lancashire, England. The station is on the East Lancashire Line 3 miles (5 km) west of Blackburn railway station.  It is managed by Northern, who also provide all the passenger services calling there.

It is unstaffed, and has no permanent buildings, other than standard waiting shelters. A long line PA system and digital information screens are provided, Step free access for disabled travellers is provided by means of ramps to each platform.

As of January 2018, along with other stations on this line, a new touch screen Ticket Machine was added to the station.

A £2,000 refurbishment scheme at the station, funded by East Lancs Community Rail Partnership and the local authority, was carried out in 2015, by a consortium of college students, community workers and volunteers.

Services
Monday to Saturdays, there is an hourly service from Pleasington towards Preston westbound and Blackburn, Burnley Central and Colne, eastbound. There is a two-hourly service on Sundays.

From 14 May 2012, Pleasington became a request only stop, in addition to Hapton, Burnley Barracks and Huncoat.

References

External links

Railway stations in Blackburn with Darwen
DfT Category F2 stations
Former Lancashire and Yorkshire Railway stations
Railway stations in Great Britain opened in 1846
Northern franchise railway stations
Railway request stops in Great Britain
1846 establishments in England